Madang Road is became interchange station between lines 9 and 13 of the Shanghai Metro on 19 December 2015.

The station opened on 31 December 2009, together with the other stations on Line 9's east extension.

The station was the temporary (between 20 April 2010 and 2 November 2010) terminus of Expo line/Line 13 during 2010 World Expo.

The station is located near the intersection of Madang Road and Xujiahui Road in Shanghai's Huangpu District.

Station Layout 

Railway stations in Shanghai
Shanghai Metro stations in Huangpu District
Railway stations in China opened in 2009
Line 9, Shanghai Metro
Line 13, Shanghai Metro